Crucianella (common name crossworts) is a genus of flowering plants in the family Rubiaceae. The species are annual herbs found from the Mediterranean to Central Asia and the Arabian Peninsula. One species (C. angustifolia) is naturalized in northern California, southern Oregon (Josephine County), and Idaho (Clearwater County).

Species

Crucianella aegyptiaca L.
Crucianella angustifolia L.
Crucianella arabica Schönb.-Tem. & Ehrend.
Crucianella baldschuanica Krasch.
Crucianella bithynica Boiss.
Crucianella bouarfae Andreonszkyu
Crucianella bucharica B.Fedtsch.
Crucianella chlorostachys Fisch. & C.A.Mey.
Crucianella ciliata Lam.
Crucianella disticha Boiss.
Crucianella divaricata Korovin
Crucianella exasperata Fisch. & C.A.Mey.
Crucianella filifolia Regel & Schmalh.
Crucianella gilanica Trin.
Crucianella graeca Boiss.
Crucianella hirta Pomel
Crucianella imbricata Boiss.
Crucianella kurdistanica Malin.
Crucianella latifolia L.
Crucianella macrostachya Boiss.
Crucianella maritima L.
Crucianella membranacea Boiss.
Crucianella parviflora Ehrend.
Crucianella patula L.
Crucianella platyphylla Ehrend. & Schönb.-Tem.
Crucianella sabulosa Korovin & Krasch.
Crucianella schischkinii Lincz.
Crucianella sintenisii Bornm.
Crucianella sorgerae Ehrend.
Crucianella suaveolens C.A.Mey.
Crucianella transjordanica Rech.f.

Image gallery

References

External links
World Checklist of Rubiaceae

Rubiaceae genera
Rubieae
Flora of Europe
Flora of Central Asia
Flora of California
Flora of Oregon
Flora of Idaho